Harold Gibson (27 December 1878 – 12 August 1921) was an Australian rules footballer who played for the South Melbourne Football Club in the Victorian Football League (VFL). He died in a car accident at the age of 42.

References

External links 

1878 births
1921 deaths
Australian rules footballers from Victoria (Australia)
Sydney Swans players
Ballarat Imperial Football Club players
Road incident deaths in Victoria (Australia)